The 1979 South African Professional Championship was a non-ranking snooker tournament, which took place in August 1979.
The tournament featured five exclusively South African players - Derek Mienie, Jimmy van Rensberg, Mannie Francisco, Peter Francisco and the incumbent champion, Perrie Mans.

Mienie won the title, beating van Rensberg 9–6 in the final.

Qualifying

A first-round match was played between Mienie and Mannie Francisco, to determine who would advance to the semi-finals to play Mans, who was seeded through to this stage.

Derek Mienie 9–3 Mannie Francisco

Main draw

References

South African Professional Championship
South African Professional Championship
South African Professional Championship
South African Professional Championship
Snooker in South Africa